Łaniewo may refer to:

Łaniewo, West Pomeranian Voivodeship
Łaniewo, Warmian-Masurian Voivodeship
Łaniewo-Leśniczówka, Warmian-Masurian Voivodeship